Eigil Nielsen (6 December 1948 – 26 December 2019) was a Danish footballer who played as a midfielder during the late 1960s, 70s and into the 80s.

Club career
Nielsen began his youth football by the local club Hjørring IF and with them his professional career in 1966 before moving to KB in 1970. In 1971, he signed for Switzerland's Winterthur and he played there until 1974. Due to financial reasons Winterthur sold him to FC Basel during the summer break.

Between the years 1974 und 1978 Nielsen played a total of 164 games for FC Basel scoring a total of 30 goals. 99 of these games and 18 goals were in the Swiss domestic league. 21 games were in the Swiss Cup or Swiss League Cup, 23 were international cup games and 30 were test games. In his debut for Basel on 20 July 1974 in the Cup of the Alps away match against Nîmes Olympique Nielsen scored a hat trick for his new club. In his first season with Basel they won the Swiss Cup and in the following season they won the Swiss Championship. Nielsen scored his only European goal on 29 September 1976 in the second leg of the first round of the 1976–77 UEFA Cup. Basel played at home in St. Jakob Stadium and won 3–0 against Glentoran F.C.

In 1978 he signed for Luzern who played in the second highest tier at that time and that season Luzern won promotion. Nielsen retired in 1981.

International career
Nielsen was capped ten times by the Denmark national team, making his international debut in Denmark's 3-2 win over Japan on 28 July 1971 in Parken, Copenhagen. His last match for the national team was in a 6-1 defeat to Romania on 23 August 1975 in Bucharest.

Honours
Basel
 Swiss League: 1976–77
 Swiss Cup: 1974–75

References

External links
 
 International Stats

1948 births
2019 deaths
People from Hjørring Municipality
Danish men's footballers
Association football midfielders
Denmark international footballers
Kjøbenhavns Boldklub players
FC Basel players
FC Luzern players
FC Winterthur players
Danish expatriate men's footballers
Danish expatriate sportspeople in Switzerland
Expatriate footballers in Switzerland
Sportspeople from the North Jutland Region